Federico Pablo Ezequiel Ruiz (born 18 May 1989) is an Argentine football player who plays for Sintrense on loan from Sporting.

Club career
He made his professional debut in the Primera B Metropolitana for Deportivo Merlo on 2 September 2014 in a game against Tristán Suárez.

He signed with Sporting on 2 June 2016 on the same day as his brother Alan. He was sent on loan to the third-tier team Sintrense until the end of the 2016–17 season on 24 August 2016.

Personal
He is the older brother of Alan Ruiz.

References

1989 births
People from Berisso
Living people
Argentine footballers
CD Linares players
Lucena CF players
Argentine expatriate footballers
Expatriate footballers in Spain
Ontinyent CF players
CD Guadalajara (Spain) footballers
Club de Gimnasia y Esgrima La Plata footballers
Club Atlético Platense footballers
Deportivo Merlo footballers
Club Atlético Colón footballers
Argentine Primera División players
Expatriate footballers in Portugal
Association football midfielders
S.U. Sintrense players
Sportspeople from Buenos Aires Province